Reijn or van Reijn is a surname. Notable people with the surname include: 

Halina Reijn (born 1975), Dutch actress, writer and film director
Theo van Reijn (1884–1954), Dutch sculptor

Dutch-language surnames